Syzygium graeme-andersonii is a species of plant in the family Myrtaceae. It is a tree endemic to Peninsular Malaysia. The species was originally named in the genus Eugenia, as E. graeme-andersoniae by H. N. Ridley, honouring Mrs. Graeme Anderson.

References

graeme-andersoniae
Endemic flora of Peninsular Malaysia
Trees of Peninsular Malaysia
Least concern plants
Taxonomy articles created by Polbot
Taxobox binomials not recognized by IUCN